Jack Hearn Watson Jr. (born October 24, 1938) is an American corporate strategist and political aide who served as White House Chief of Staff to President Jimmy Carter from 1980 to 1981.

Personal life 
Watson is a Phi Beta Kappa graduate of Vanderbilt University and received his law degree from Harvard Law School. He served in the U.S. Marine Corps as a Pathfinder and Reconnaissance Team Leader, First Force Reconnaissance Company, and left the Marine Corps with the rank of captain.

Career 
He served as head of the Carter-Mondale Policy Planning Group in 1976, and later was Director of the Transition Team during the transition of government from President Ford to President Carter. In the Carter administration from 1977 to 1981, he served as Assistant to the President for Intergovernmental Affairs, Secretary to the Cabinet, and White House Chief of Staff.  He chaired the President's Interagency Coordinating Council created by Executive Order in 1978 to coordinate implementation of the President's domestic policy.

Watson had earlier been a protege of Charles Kirbo and a highly successful trial lawyer at King & Spalding in Atlanta. He had served as a close aide to Carter during his gubernatorial campaigns and was particularly close to Carter’s mother, “Miss Lillian.”  Charismatic, classy and inspirational, Watson characteristically told transition staff at its first meeting in Washington, D.C. following the 1976 election that when working with Executive Branch employees they should view them, not suspiciously, but “as all Carter people.”

Post–Carter Administration 
From January 1998 to June 2000, he served as Chief Legal Strategist of Monsanto Company.

External links

Biography from a University of Miami website

 https://www.jimmycarterlibrary.gov/assets/documents/findingaids/Watson_Jack.pdf

1938 births
Harvard Law School alumni
Carter administration personnel
Living people
Vanderbilt University alumni
White House Chiefs of Staff